Far Hills is a borough in Somerset County in the U.S. state of New Jersey. As of the 2010 United States census, the population was 919, reflecting an increase of 60 (+7.0%) from the 859 counted in the 2000 Census, which had in turn increased by 202 (+30.7%) from the 657 counted in the 1990 Census.

Far Hills was incorporated as a borough based on an Act of the New Jersey Legislature passed on April 7, 1921, from portions of Bernards Township, subject to the results of a referendum held on May 12, 1921. Far Hills is a dry town where alcohol is not permitted to be sold by law. It is located within the Raritan Valley region.

History
It shares a community pool, athletic programs, civic organizations, and a school system with Bernardsville. It shares a public library, a fire department and a first aid squad with neighboring Bedminster Township.

The borough maintains its character through  minimum zoning laws whereby large private properties and homes surround a small village which was the creation of a wealthy New York businessman in the late 1800s. The beginning of rail service to nearby Bernardsville in 1870, opened the area to city people seeking a respite from the heat and hurry of urban life.

Evander H. Schley, a land developer and real estate broker from New York, purchased thousands of acres in Bedminster and Bernards townships in the 1880s. One day in 1887, Schley's brother, Grant, and his wife, Elizabeth, arrived by horse-drawn carriage to see Evander's farms. Elizabeth is said to have remarked on the beautiful vista of the "far hills," thus giving the name to the place before a village was built.

Geography
According to the United States Census Bureau, the borough had a total area of 4.90 square miles (12.69 km2), including 4.85 square miles (12.55 km2) of land and 0.06 square miles (0.14 km2) of water (1.12%).

The borough borders the Somerset County municipalities of Bedminster Township to the west, Bernards Township to the east, Bernardsville to the northeast and Peapack-Gladstone to the northwest.

Climate
The climate in the area is characterized by hot, humid summers and generally cold winters.  According to the Köppen Climate Classification system, Far Hills has a humid continental climate, abbreviated "Dfa" on climate maps.

Demographics

Census 2010

The Census Bureau's 2006–2010 American Community Survey showed that (in 2010 inflation-adjusted dollars) median household income was $125,833 (with a margin of error of +/− $29,841) and the median family income was $202,083 (+/− $85,006). Males had a median income of $177,083 (+/− $60,611) versus $76,250 (+/− $38,263) for females. The per capita income for the borough was $93,495 (+/− $19,515). About 3.6% of families and 3.7% of the population were below the poverty line, including 3.3% of those under age 18 and 4.8% of those age 65 or over.

Census 2000
As of the 2000 United States census there were 859 people, 368 households, and 253 families. The population density was 176.8 people per square mile (68.2/km2). There were 386 housing units at an average density of 79.4 per square mile (30.7/km2). The racial makeup was 96.04% White, 0.81% African American, 0.12% Native American, 2.10% Asian, and 0.93% from two or more races. Hispanic or Latino of any race were 3.61% of the population.

There were 368 households, out of which 22.6% had children under the age of 18 living with them, 59.5% were married couples living together, 5.7% had a female householder with no husband present, and 31.3% were non-families. 25.5% of all households were made up of individuals, and 6.8% had someone living alone who was 65 years of age or older. The average household size was 2.33 and the average family size was 2.76.

The population was spread out, with 18.4% under the age of 18, 3.5% from 18 to 24, 28.8% from 25 to 44, 32.8% from 45 to 64, and 16.5% who were 65 years of age or older. The median age was 45 years. For every 100 females, there were 88.8 males. For every 100 females age 18 and over, there were 88.9 males.

The median income for a household was $112,817, and the median income for a family was $149,095. Males had a median income of $90,000 versus $46,607 for females. The per capita income was $81,535. About 0.8% of families and 2.5% of the population were below the poverty line, including 3.8% of those under age 18 and 1.2% of those age 65 or over.

Sports
The United States Golf Association has a Far Hills mailing address but is actually located in Bernards Township. The United States Golf Association Museum and Arnold Palmer Center for Golf History is located on the premises.

From 2000 through 2005 the Breeders' Cup Grand National Steeplechase returned to the Far Hills Races after a hiatus of six years. Known for the highest prize money of a steeplechase in America, the purse for the Breeders' Cup winner has been as large as $250,000 and has attracted up to 100,000 spectators. Several races are scheduled by Far Hills Race Meeting Association in late October of each year. Considered one of the premier social events of the year in the tri-state area, it is attended by as many as 75,000 people annually.

Parks and recreation
 The Leonard J. Buck Garden, is a public botanical garden operated by the Somerset County Park Commission, and located at 11 Layton Road. It is open daily; a small fee is requested.
 Moggy Hollow Natural Area is a National Natural Landmark adjacent to the Buck Garden.
 Natirar is an estate spanning  in Far Hills, Peapack-Gladstone and Bedminster that was sold in 2003 by Mohammed VI, King of Morocco, to the Somerset County Park Commission.

Government

Local government
Far Hills is governed under the Borough form of New Jersey municipal government, which is used in 218 municipalities (of the 564) statewide, making it the most common form of government in New Jersey. The governing body is comprised of the Mayor and the Borough Council, with all positions elected at-large on a partisan basis as part of the November general election. A Mayor is elected directly by the voters to a four-year term of office. The Borough Council is comprised of six members elected to serve three-year terms on a staggered basis, with two seats coming up for election each year in a three-year cycle. The Borough form of government used by Far Hills is a "weak mayor / strong council" government in which council members act as the legislative body with the mayor presiding at meetings and voting only in the event of a tie. The mayor can veto ordinances subject to an override by a two-thirds majority vote of the council. The mayor makes committee and liaison assignments for council members, and most appointments are made by the mayor with the advice and consent of the council. 

, the Mayor of Far Hills is Republican Dr. Paul J. Vallone, whose term of office ends on December 31, 2022. Members of the Far Hills Borough Council are Council President David P. Karner (R, 2022), Joseph E. Carty (R, 2023), Mary Chimenti (R, 2024), Edward R. "Ted" McLean (R, 2022; elected to serve an unexpired term), Sheila J. Tweedie (R, 2023) and Kevin Welsh (R, 2024).

In November 2019, the Borough Council selected Ted McLean to fill the weeks remaining in the seat expiring in December 2019 that had been held by David R. Surks until he resigned from office earlier that month. Surks was re-elected in the November 2019 general election In January 2020, McLean was appointed to fill Surks' term expiring in December 2022 and will serve on an interim basis until the November 2020 general election.

Emergency services
Emergency services in the borough are offered by the Far Hills-Bedminster Fire Department, Far Hills Police Department, and Far Hills-Bedminster First Aid Squad. Far Hills-Bedminster Fire Department roots back to the establishment of Union Hook & Ladder Company #1 in December 1900; The current name was adopted in 1998 to avoid confusion with other departments with similar names.

Federal, state and county representation
Far Hills is located in the 7th Congressional District and is part of New Jersey's 21st state legislative district. Prior to the 2011 reapportionment following the 2010 Census, Far Hills had been in the 16th state legislative district.

 

Somerset County is governed by a five-member Board of County Commissioners, whose members are elected at-large to three-year terms of office on a staggered basis, with one or two seats coming up for election each year. At an annual reorganization meeting held on the first Friday of January, the board selects a Director and Deputy Director from among its members. , Somerset County's County Commissioners are
Director Shanel Robinson (D, Franklin Township, term as commissioner ends December 31, 2024; term as director ends 2022),
Deputy Director Melonie Marano (D, Green Brook Township, term as commissioner and as deputy director ends 2022),
Paul Drake (D, Hillsborough Township, 2023),
Douglas Singleterry (D, North Plainfield, 2023) and 
Sara Sooy (D, Basking Ridge in Bernards Township, 2024).
Pursuant to Article VII Section II of the New Jersey State Constitution, each county in New Jersey is required to have three elected administrative officials known as constitutional officers. These officers are the County Clerk and County Surrogate (both elected for five-year terms of office) and the County Sheriff (elected for a three-year term). Constitutional officers, elected on a countywide basis are 
County Clerk Steve Peter (D, Somerville, 2022),
Sheriff Darrin Russo (D, Franklin Township, 2022) and 
Surrogate Bernice "Tina" Jalloh (D, Franklin Township, 2025)

Politics
As of March 23, 2011, there were a total of 748 registered voters in Far Hills, of which 97 (13.0% vs. 26.0% countywide) were registered as Democrats, 382 (51.1% vs. 25.7%) were registered as Republicans and 268 (35.8% vs. 48.2%) were registered as Unaffiliated. There was one voter registered to another party. Among the borough's 2010 Census population, 81.4% (vs. 60.4% in Somerset County) were registered to vote, including 107.2% of those ages 18 and over (vs. 80.4% countywide).

In the 2012 presidential election, Republican Mitt Romney received 70.6% of the vote (348 cast), ahead of Democrat Barack Obama with 27.8% (137 votes), and other candidates with 1.0% (5 votes), among the 493 ballots cast by the borough's 793 registered voters (3 ballots were spoiled), for a turnout of 62.2%. In the 2008 presidential election, Republican John McCain received 355 votes (63.1% vs. 46.1% countywide), ahead of Democrat Barack Obama with 196 votes (34.8% vs. 52.1%) and other candidates with 5 votes (0.9% vs. 1.1%), among the 563 ballots cast by the borough's 726 registered voters, for a turnout of 77.5% (vs. 78.7% in Somerset County). In the 2004 presidential election, Republican George W. Bush received 342 votes (67.7% vs. 51.5% countywide), ahead of Democrat John Kerry with 160 votes (31.7% vs. 47.2%) and other candidates with 2 votes (0.4% vs. 0.9%), among the 505 ballots cast by the borough's 636 registered voters, for a turnout of 79.4% (vs. 81.7% in the whole county).

In the 2013 gubernatorial election, Republican Chris Christie received 84.9% of the vote (275 cast), ahead of Democrat Barbara Buono with 13.0% (42 votes), and other candidates with 2.2% (7 votes), among the 324 ballots cast by the borough's 799 registered voters, for a turnout of 40.6%. In the 2009 gubernatorial election, Republican Chris Christie received 282 votes (69.6% vs. 55.8% countywide), ahead of Democrat Jon Corzine with 65 votes (16.0% vs. 34.1%), Independent Chris Daggett with 52 votes (12.8% vs. 8.7%) and other candidates with 5 votes (1.2% vs. 0.7%), among the 405 ballots cast by the borough's 743 registered voters, yielding a 54.5% turnout (vs. 52.5% in the county).

Education
Students in public school attend the schools of the Somerset Hills Regional School District, a regional school district covering pre-kindergarten through twelfth grade serving students from Bernardsville, Far Hills, and Peapack-Gladstone, along with students from Bedminster Township who attend the district's high school as part of a sending/receiving relationship. As of the 2020–21 school year, the district, comprised of three schools, had an enrollment of 1,797 students and 155.3 classroom teachers (on an FTE basis), for a student–teacher ratio of 11.6:1. Schools in the district (with 2020–21 enrollment data from the National Center for Education Statistics) are 
Marion T. Bedwell Elementary School with 471 students in grades Pre-K–4, 
Bernardsville Middle School with 474 students in grades 5–8 and 
Bernards High School with 819 students in grades 9–12. The district's board of education is comprised of nine elected members (plus one appointed member representing Bedminster) who set policy and oversee the fiscal and educational operation of the district through its administration. The nine elected seats on the board are allocated to the constituent municipalities based on population, with one seat allocated to Far Hills.

Far Hills Country Day School is a private, nonsectarian coeducational day school located in Far Hills, serving 444 students in nursery through eighth grade on a  campus.

Transportation

Roads and highways

The most prominent highway serving Far Hills is Interstate 287. U.S. Route 202 also passes through the borough.

Public transportation
NJ Transit provides service at the Far Hills train station on the Gladstone Branch of the Morristown Line; the building is listed on the National Register of Historic Places and is located at U.S. Route 202, near the intersection of Far Hills Road, one half mile east of U.S. Route 206, offering service via Secaucus Junction and New York Penn Station or to Hoboken Terminal.

Lakeland Bus Lines provides Route 78 rush-hour service from Bedminster to the Port Authority Bus Terminal in Midtown Manhattan.

Notable people

People who were born in, residents of, or otherwise closely associated with Far Hills include:

 Nicholas F. Brady (born 1930), former United States Secretary of the Treasury who represented New Jersey in the United States Senate
 James Chesson (born 1980), race car driver
 P. J. Chesson (born 1978), IndyCar driver who raced in the 2006 Indianapolis 500
 Charles W. Engelhard Jr. (1917–1971), businessman who controlled an international mining and metals conglomerate and was a major owner of thoroughbred race horses
 Malcolm Forbes (1919–1990), former editor-in-chief of Forbes magazine
 Steve Forbes (born 1947), editor-in-chief of Forbes
 Joseph S. Frelinghuysen Jr. (1912–2005), author of Passages to Freedom, about his escape from a prison camp in Italy during World War II
 J. Geils (1946–2017), blues-rock lead guitarist, singer, and founder of The J. Geils Band
 Jack H. Jacobs (born 1945), retired colonel in the United States Army and a Medal of Honor recipient for his actions during the Vietnam War
 John S. Penn (1926–2013), politician who represented the 16th Legislative District in the New Jersey General Assemblyfrom 1984 to 1994
 Joe J. Plumeri (born 1944), Chairman & CEO of Willis Group and owner of the Trenton Thunder
 Michael F. Price (born 1951), value investor and fund manager
 Aileen Quinn (born 1971), actress, singer and dancer best known for her role as Annie Bennett Warbucks in the 1982 film Annie
 Andrew Schlafly (born 1961), founder of Conservapedia, son of Phyllis Schlafly
 James Wallwork (born 1930), politician who served in both houses of the New Jersey Legislature
 Christine Todd Whitman (born 1946), former Governor of New Jersey
 Kate Whitman Annis (born ), general manager of the Metropolitan Riveters of the National Women's Hockey League

References

External links

 Borough website
 The complete history of the Far Hills Race Meeting
 Far Hills Police website
 Information page for Far Hills, Somerset County, New Jersey
 Somerset Hills School District
 
 Data for the Somerset Hills School District, National Center for Education Statistics
 The Historical Society of the Somerset Hills

 
1921 establishments in New Jersey
Borough form of New Jersey government
Boroughs in Somerset County, New Jersey
Populated places established in 1921